Clopamide (trade name Brinaldix) is a piperidine diuretic.

Mechanism of action
Clopamide is categorised as a thiazide-like diuretic and works in similar way as the thiazide diuretics do. It acts in the kidneys, at the distal convoluted tubule (DCT) of the nephron where it inhibits the sodium-chloride symporter. Clopamide selectively binds at the chloride binding site of the sodium-chloride symporter in the PCT cells on the luminal (interior) side and thus interferes with the reabsorption of sodium chloride, causing an equiosmolar excretion of water along with sodium chloride.

References 

Piperidines
Sulfonamides
Hydrazides
Novartis brands
Diuretics
Carbonic anhydrase inhibitors